Ahmed Othman (born February 25, 1989) is an Egyptian Greco-Roman wrestler. He competed in the men's Greco-Roman 85 kg event at the 2016 Summer Olympics, in which he was eliminated in the repechage by Nikolay Bayryakov.

References

External links 
 

1989 births
Living people
Egyptian male sport wrestlers
Olympic wrestlers of Egypt
Wrestlers at the 2016 Summer Olympics
21st-century Egyptian people